A caraco is a style of woman's jacket that was fashionable from the mid-18th to early 19th centuries.  Caracos were thigh-length and opened in front, with tight three-quarter or long sleeves. Like gowns of the period, the back of the caraco could be fitted to the waist or could hang in pleats from the shoulder in the style of a sack back.  Caracos were generally made of printed linen or cotton.  

The caraco emerged as an informal style in France in the 1760s, based on working-class jackets.  It was worn with a petticoat and, if open in front, a stomacher or decorative stays. The English caraco was generally closed in front. A similar garment with a wrap front, called in English a bedgown or short gown, was the standard working woman's costume of the later 18th century.

Gallery
Women's jackets and short gowns of the 18th century

Notes

References
 Cumming, Valerie, C. W. Cunnington and P. E. Cunnington.  The Dictionary of Fashion History, Berg, 2010, 
 Takeda, Sharon Sadako, and Kaye Durland Spilker, Fashioning Fashion: European Dress in Detail, 1700 - 1915,  Prestel USA (2010),

External links
 Caraco and matching petticoat, Victoria and Albert Museum, c. 1770s.

18th-century fashion
Jackets
History of clothing (Western fashion)